Manassas Mall is a shopping center located in Bull Run, Virginia (near Manassas). Built in 1972, it is owned by Lionheart Capital LLC and managed by Spinoso Real Estate Group.  formerly by Vornado Realty Trust which shelved its regional mall holdings in 2014. The mall is anchored by Macy's, Walmart and an At Home, There is also a bowling alley and an indoor go-kart track.

History
The mall was built by Interstate Properties, with Grant City and Montgomery Ward serving as the original anchors. Hecht's later took over the Grant's space. Leggett and Sears were added in the 1980s. At this point, the mall was opened by Interstate Properties.

Leggett closed in 1997, and J. C. Penney took over the space the same year. Also that year, the Hecht's relocated to a new store, with Target Corporation building a new store on the former Hecht's site. After Montgomery Ward closed, Sears moved into the former Montgomery Ward building. Hecht's became Macy's in September 2006. In 2015, it was announced At Home would replace J C. Penney which would close.

In February 2020, Sears was permanently closed due to bankruptcy.

References

External links
Official website

Shopping malls in Virginia
Shopping malls established in 1972
Bull Run, Virginia
JLL (company)
1972 establishments in Virginia
Shopping malls in the Washington metropolitan area